Saint-Gervais may refer to the following places:

France

 Saint-Gervais, former commune of the Aveyron department, now part of Saint-Symphorien-de-Thénières
 Saint-Gervais, former commune of the Charente department, now part of Nanteuil-en-Vallée
 Saint-Gervais, Gard, in the Gard department
 Saint-Gervais, Gironde, in the Gironde department
 Saint-Gervais, Isère, in the Isère department
 Saint-Gervais, Vendée, in the Vendée department
 Saint-Gervais, Val-d'Oise, in the Val-d'Oise department
 Saint-Gervais-d'Auvergne, in the Puy-de-Dôme department
 Saint-Gervais-des-Sablons, in the Orne department
 Saint-Gervais-de-Vic, in the Sarthe department
 Saint-Gervais-du-Perron, in the Orne department
 Saint-Gervais-en-Belin, in the Sarthe department
 Saint-Gervais-en-Vallière, in the Saône-et-Loire department
 Saint-Gervais-la-Forêt, in the Loir-et-Cher department
 Saint-Gervais-les-Bains, in the Haute-Savoie department, a ski resort
 Saint-Gervais-les-Trois-Clochers, in the Vienne department
 Saint-Gervais-sous-Meymont, in the Puy-de-Dôme department
 Saint-Gervais-sur-Couches, in the Saône-et-Loire department
 Saint-Gervais-sur-Mare, in the Hérault department
 Saint-Gervais-sur-Roubion, in the Drôme department
 Saint-Jean-Saint-Gervais,  in the Puy-de-Dôme department

Elsewhere

 Saint-Gervais, Quebec, Canada
 Saint-Gervais (Geneva), a neighbourhood of Geneva, Switzerland

Other uses
 Place Saint-Gervais, a square in Paris, adjacent to the city hall
 St-Gervais-et-St-Protais Church, in Paris

See also
 Saint Gervase, 2nd-century Christian martyr